Winston Hauschild is the professional name of Canadian record producer Ryan Hauschild, a songwriter and recording artist based in British Columbia. As of 2018 he operates Little Island Studio on Bowen Island.

Early life
Ryan Hauschild was born in Summerland, British Columbia on September 29, 1973.

Career

Winston
Houschild founded an indie pop band called Winston, with guitarist Lanny Hussey, drummer Robbie Watkins and bassist Tony Kerr. After releasing and EP in 2001, the band won CFOX Radio's 2003 Vancouver Seeds band contest, and that year released an album, Passengers. They toured in support of the album in 2004.

Solo career and producing

In 2007, by then going by the name Winston, Hauschild signed a recording contract with Aquarius Records and began recording as a solo artist. That year he released an EP, Limited, using vintage analogue equipment.

Hauschild began producing albums for other artists, including Hannah Georgas, Bodhi Jones and Wanting Qu, whose album Everything in the World has been certified triple platinum in China and Hong Kong.  Hauschild also served on the Board of Directors for the non-profit British Columbia industry association Music BC.

In 2013 Hauschilde released an album of his own compositions, Beginning of the Long Dash. That year he helped to produce a compilation album as part of Vancouver radio station 102.7FM's annual PEAK Performance Project battle of the bands contest.

By 2014 he was living on Bowen Island, while continuing his production work at Fader Master Studios in Vancouver. By 2016 he was operating his own studio on Bowen Island.

Hauschild sometimes contributes musically to the albums he produces; for example, he added keyboard sounds to the Chicken-Like Birds' 2017 album Moving ON.

Discography

Production credits

References

External links
 Official website

1973 births
Living people
Canadian songwriters
Canadian record producers
Musicians from British Columbia
People from Summerland, British Columbia